The golden whorltail iguana (Stenocercus chrysopygus) is a species of lizard of the Tropiduridae family.

It is endemic to western Peru, where it inhabits the puna grassland.

References

Stenocercus
Reptiles described in 1900
Endemic fauna of Peru
Reptiles of Peru
Taxa named by George Albert Boulenger